Johannes Micraelius, actually Johannes Lütkeschwager, (Köslin, 1 September 1597 – Stettin, 3 December 1658) was a German poet, philosopher, and historiographer.

Life 
Johannes Micraelius was a son to Joachim Lütkeschwager († 1619), who originated from Jamund and was an archdeacon in Köslin. Esther (1600–1665), Johannes' sister, was married to the famous theologian Jacobus Fabricius.

Johannes went to school in his native town, before continuing his studies at the Stettin pedagogy. In 1617, he started his higher education at the University of Königsberg. Consequently, in 1624, Johannes was given a professorship in rhetoric at the University of Greifswald. During this period, Micraelius wrote his six books on the history of Pomerania, which he had printed by the Stettin publisher Georg Rhete. In 1641, he accepted the position of rector at the royal pedagogy of Stettin. In the same year, he was named professor in theology and philosophy.

In 1649, Micraelius graduated in theology at the University of Greifswald. He started a career there, ending up being pro-chancellor of the university in 1656. During his academic career, he wrote a number of tragedies and comedies, inspired by themes from classical antiquity. However, his most proclaimed works would be his historical and theological publications. Finally, his 1653  became very popular, even launching the term ontology (even though he only used it in Greek characters).

Works 
 , 1630
 , 1631
 : , 1631
 , 1639 to 1640
 1st book: 
 2nd book: 
 3rd book: 
 4th book: 
 5th book: 
 6th book: 
 , 1642
 , 1647
 , 1647
 , 1648
 , 1649
 , 1650
 , 1650
 , 1652
 , 1652
 , 1653

Further reading 
Krickeberg, K. (1897). . Osterwieck.
Wendt, E. (2004). . Köln-Weimar-Wien (pp. 339–341).

References 

1597 births
1658 deaths
17th-century Latin-language writers
17th-century German historians
German philosophers